United Nations Security Council resolution 1140, adopted unanimously on 28 November 1997, after recalling resolutions 1110 (1997), the Council renewed the mandate of the United Nations Preventive Deployment Force (UNPREDEP) in Macedonia for four days until 4 December 1997, pending further discussions. Resolution 1142 (1997) later extended UNPREDEP until 31 August 1998.

See also
 Breakup of Yugoslavia
 List of United Nations Security Council Resolutions 1101 to 1200 (1997–1998)
 Macedonia naming dispute
 Yugoslav Wars

References

External links
 
Text of the Resolution at undocs.org

 1140
 1140
1997 in Yugoslavia
1997 in the Republic of Macedonia
 1140
November 1997 events